Kaudgaon is a village in Parbhani taluka of Parbhani district of Maharashtra state in India.

Demography
According to the 2011 census of India, Kaudgaon had a population of 2005, of which 1021 were male and 984 were female. The average sex ratio of the village was 964, which was higher than the Maharashtra state average of 929. The literacy rate was 70.54% compared to 82.3% for the state. Male literacy rate was 81% while female literacy rate was 59%.

Geography and Transport
Following table shows distance of Kaudgaon from some of major cities.

References

Villages in Parbhani district